John Patrick Wilson (8 July 1923 – 9 July 2007) was an Irish Fianna Fáil politician who served as Tánaiste from 1990 to 1993, Minister for Defence and Minister for the Gaeltacht from 1992 to 1993, Minister for the Marine from 1989 to 1992, Minister for Tourism and Transport from 1987 to 1989, Minister for Communications in March 1987, Minister for Posts and Telegraphs from March 1982 to December 1982 and Minister for Education from 1977 to 1981. He served as a Teachta Dála (TD) from 1973 to 1992.

Early life
Wilson was born in 1923 at Callanagh, Kilcogy, County Cavan, the son of John Wilson, a farmer, and his wife Brigid (née Comaskey). He was educated at St. Mel's College in Longford, the University of London and the National University of Ireland. In 1942 he entered Maynooth College to train for the catholic priesthood, but left after four years as a seminarian. He graduated with a Master of Arts in Classics and a Higher Diploma in Education. He was a secondary school teacher at St Eunan's College in Letterkenny and Gonzaga College and also a university lecturer at University College Dublin (UCD), before he became involved in politics.

Gaelic football
Wilson was also a Gaelic footballer for the Cavan county team, with which he won two All-Ireland medals; one in 1947 in the Polo Grounds, New York. He was a member of the teachers trade union, the Association of Secondary Teachers, Ireland (ASTI), and served as president of the association. While at St Eunan's College in Letterkenny (at which time he lived at 2 College Row, close to the school gates, and taught within them between 1952 and 1960),

Wilson was known as "Big Johnny", training the team that would reach the final of the 1961 MacRory Cup (though he departed for a teaching post at Gonzaga College midway through the year).

Political career
Wilson was first elected to Dáil Éireann at the 1973 general election for the Cavan constituency, for Cavan–Monaghan in 1977 and at each subsequent election until his retirement after the dissolution of the 26th Dail in 1992. He was succeeded as Fianna Fáil TD for Cavan-Monaghan by his special advisor, Brendan Smith, who went on to serve as Minister for Agriculture, Fisheries and Food from 2008 to 2011. In 1977, Taoiseach Jack Lynch appointed Wilson to the cabinet as Minister for Education. He went on to serve in each Fianna Fáil government until his retirement, serving in the governments of Jack Lynch, Charles Haughey and Albert Reynolds.

In 1990, Wilson challenged Brian Lenihan for the Fianna Fáil nomination for the 1990 presidential election. Lenihan won the nomination but failed to be elected President and was also sacked from the government. Wilson was then appointed Tánaiste. He remained in the cabinet until retirement in 1993. Although the 26th Dail was dissolved in December 1992, Wilson served in Government until the new government took office.

Retirement
Following his retirement from politics, Wilson was appointed the Commissioner of the Independent Commission for the Location of Victims' Remains by Taoiseach Bertie Ahern. This position entailed involvement with members of the Provisional IRA to assist in finding the bodies of the disappeared who were murdered by the Provisional IRA during The Troubles.

Wilson died in Beaumont, Dublin, on 9 July 2007.

See also
Families in the Oireachtas

References

External links
Friends we lost: Mr. John Wilson – Article at Hogan Stand

1923 births
2007 deaths
Academics of University College Dublin
Alumni of the University of London
Cavan inter-county Gaelic footballers
Fianna Fáil TDs
Irish sportsperson-politicians
Members of the 20th Dáil
Members of the 21st Dáil
Members of the 22nd Dáil
Members of the 23rd Dáil
Members of the 24th Dáil
Members of the 25th Dáil
Members of the 26th Dáil
Ministers for Defence (Ireland)
Ministers for Education (Ireland)
Ministers for the Environment (Ireland)
Ministers for Transport (Ireland)
People associated with St Eunan's College
People educated at St Mel's College
Politicians from County Cavan
Tánaistí